John Murray MacGregor (3 December 1889 – 16 May 1966) was an Australian rules footballer who played with Richmond in the Victorian Football League (VFL).

Notes

External links 
		

1889 births
Australian rules footballers from Victoria (Australia)
Richmond Football Club players
1966 deaths